Teykovsky District is an administrative and municipal district (raion), one of the twenty-one in Ivanovo Oblast, Russia. It is located in the southwest of the oblast. Its administrative center is the town of Teykovo (which is not administratively a part of the district). Population:   14,418 (2002 Census);

Administrative and municipal status
Within the framework of administrative divisions, Teykovsky District is one of the twenty-one in the oblast. The town of Teykovo serves as its administrative center, despite being incorporated separately as an administrative unit with the status equal to that of the districts.

As a municipal division, the district is incorporated as Teykovsky Municipal District. The Town of Teykovo is incorporated separately from the district as Teykovo Urban Okrug.

References

Notes

Sources

Districts of Ivanovo Oblast
